Sheshtomad (also Romanized as Sheshtamad) is a city and capital of Sheshtomad County, Razavi Khorasan Province, Iran. In the 2006 census, its population was 2,246, in 671 families.

References 

Cities in Razavi Khorasan Province